The 2001–02 Australian region cyclone season was a slightly below average tropical cyclone season. It officially started on 1 November 2001, and ended on 30 April 2002. However, the formation of Tropical Cyclone Alex on 26 October 2001 marked an earlier beginning to the season, and the season extended past the official end of the season when Tropical Cyclone Upia formed on 25 May 2002. The regional tropical cyclone operational plan also defines a "tropical cyclone year" separately from a "tropical cyclone season"; the "tropical cyclone year" began on 1 July 2001 and ended on 30 June 2002. The scope of the Australian region is limited to all areas south of the equator, east of 90°E and west of 160°E. This area includes Australia, Papua New Guinea, western parts of the Solomon Islands, East Timor and southern parts of Indonesia.

Tropical cyclones in this area are monitored by five Tropical Cyclone Warning Centres (TCWCs): the Australian Bureau of Meteorology in Perth, Darwin, and Brisbane; TCWC Jakarta in Indonesia; and TCWC Port Moresby in Papua New Guinea. The Joint Typhoon Warning Center issues unofficial warnings for the region, designating tropical depressions with the "S" suffix when they form west of 135°E, and the "P" suffix when they form east of 135°E.



Systems

Tropical Cyclone Alex–Andre

Tropical Cyclone Alex began on 24 October 2001 when the Joint Typhoon Warning Center (JTWC) noted an area of convection developing southwest of Sumatra and north of Cocos (Keeling) Islands. On 25 October, the JTWC relocated the disturbance further west as it became better organised. The JTWC issued a Tropical Cyclone Formation Alert on the tropical low later that day. On 26 October, the Tropical Cyclone Warning Centre in Perth issued a gale warning on the system, forecasting further development. The JTWC followed suit, upgrading the low to tropical cyclone status in its first advisory. It moved slowly westward while upper-level wind shear prevented the storm from intensifying. Alex continued to move to the west-southwest, steered by a mid-level ridge to the southeast. Alex moved west of 90°E into La Réunion's area of responsibility early on 28 October and was renamed Severe Tropical Storm Andre by Mauritius. Alex-Andre at this time reached its peak intensity, with Météo-France estimating 10-min sustained winds to be 55 kn, while the JTWC estimated 1-min sustained winds to be 55 kn as well; see 2001–02 South-West Indian Ocean cyclone season.

Tropical Low 03S

A monsoon trough present near the equator spawned a low near eastern New Guinea. The system tracked westward at a very low latitude. Convection rapidly built around the system because of its position near the axis of the ridge and the low vertical wind shear in the environment. The storm was mentioned by TCWC Darwin in the daily Tropical Weather Outlook on 15 November and given a low to moderate chance of developing into a tropical cyclone within 72 hours. On 17 November, tropical depression formed near southern Papua New Guinea.

By the 19th conditions were less favourable, and the JTWC indicated that convection was sheared to the west of the well-defined, yet weak, circulation centre. Up to this point, Darwin and JTWC were in agreement regarding the system's strength and its potential for development. However, JTWC issued their first Tropical Cyclone Formation Alert on 21 November, placing the system's center about 200 nm east-northeast of Timor. At 0600 UTC they upgraded the low to a weak tropical cyclone and issued their first warning. JTWC forecast slight strengthening which did not materialise. They issued their second and final warning at 1800 UTC. In their final best track, JTWC held the estimated tropical cyclone-strength intensity through the next day. Though the system was overland for some time, the damage it caused is unknown.

Tropical Cyclone Bessi–Bako

An area of convection developed on 25 November 2001 southwest of Sumatra. The Joint Typhoon Warning Center (JTWC) issued a Tropical Cyclone Formation Alert (TCFA) on 26 November when the low continued to become better organised. At the same time, the Tropical Cyclone Warning Centre in Perth began releasing gale warnings for the storm, anticipating further development. Moderate wind shear prevented the low from intensifying, which made it necessary for the JTWC to issue another TCFA on 27 November. Shortly after, the JTWC issued their first warning on the storm, designating it 05S, while Perth upgraded the cyclone to Tropical Cyclone Bessi. Bessi was initially moving westwards, but turned to the south as a mid-level trough weakened the subtropical ridge which was steering the cyclone westwards. It weakened thereafter as it moved into an area of high vertical wind shear. It moved west of 90°E, entering La Réunion's area of responsibility, and was renamed Tropical Storm Bako. Cyclone Bessi-Bako later reached its peak intensity of 65 knots as estimated by Météo-France; see 2001–02 South-West Indian Ocean cyclone season.

Tropical Cyclone Bernie

A weak tropical low developed in the Gulf of Carpentaria northeast of Nhulunbuy, Northern Territory on 30 December. It moved slowly to the south and intensified to Tropical Cyclone Bernie on 3 January. It peaked in intensity early the next day as a Category 2 cyclone, with wind gusts reaching . Bernie was moving to the southwest and started to weaken, before crossing the coast near the borderline between Queensland and Northern Territory early on 5 January as a Category 1 cyclone. It weakened to a rain depression shortly after and continued to move southwards into the Barkly district on 6 January.

Early on 4 January, Bernie was close to making landfall over Mornington Island, and cyclone warnings were declared between the Northern Territory border and Kowanyama in Queensland. However, the cyclone warnings were shifted to the west later in the day for areas between Port McArthur in the Northern Territory and the Gilbert-Einasleigh River mouth in Queensland. As the cyclone neared the island, many residents in Mornington Island were moved to a more secure shelter. A few hours later, residents between Port McArthur and Karumba, Queensland were warned of a dangerous storm surge associated with Bernie.

A few houses in the island lost power. However, only light damages occurred, and there were no casualties on the island. The town of Karumba also experienced heavy damage, with the storm surge damaging the beach. The towns Burketown and Doomadgee in Queensland were isolated for two weeks due to flooded roads.

Pastoralists in the Gulf country were anticipating high rainfall from Bernie, but only received low rainfall. Further south in Roma, Queensland, the rains helped lift up the prices in the cattle market. People in inland areas of the Gulf country were hit by bushfires in November and December 2001 and were anticipating the arrival of Bernie, hoping that it will bring rain to extinguish the fires. However, Bernie delivered very little rain to the area.

Severe Tropical Cyclone Chris

Severe Tropical Cyclone Chris developed on 2 February off the north Western Australia coast. The storm peaked with  winds before making landfall to the east of Port Hedland, Western Australia and dissipated overland on 6 February. Chris was responsible for some inland flooding.

Severe Tropical Cyclone Claudia

The system did not develop further until on 11 February where it began to develop rapidly. A couple hours later, the low was upgraded to Tropical Cyclone Claudia by TCWC Brisbane, while the JTWC also upgraded the storm to tropical cyclone status, designating it as Tropical Cyclone 14P. The very small cyclone was moving southeastwards and continued to rapidly intensify due to good outflow. Claudia was moving quickly to the southeast towards Fiji's area of responsibility and TCWC Brisbane its last warning for Claudia later that day when it moved east of 160°E out of TCWC Brisbane's area of responsibility; see 2001–02 South Pacific cyclone season.

Tropical Cyclone Des

Late on 4 March, the Tropical Cyclone Warning Centre (TCWC) in Brisbane initiated warnings for the tropical low as the system's convection deepened. The Joint Typhoon Warning Center (JTWC) issued a Tropical Cyclone Formation Alert for the storm, and later upgraded it to Tropical Cyclone 17P at 0600 UTC on 5 March. The cyclone was moving to the east-southeast, steered by a low to mid-level ridge east of the storm. Warnings were issued by RSMC Nadi thereafter as the cyclone continued to move to the southeast; see 2001–02 South Pacific cyclone season.

Severe Tropical Cyclone Dianne–Jery

Cyclone Dianne formed after a long period of cyclone inactivity off northwestern Australia and in the Southeast Indian Ocean since Cyclone Chris in early February. The system intensified under favourable conditions and outflow improved over the storm. The Joint Typhoon Warning Center (JTWC) issued a Tropical Cyclone Formation Alert on 6 April for the system, and upgraded it to Tropical Cyclone 21S on 7 April, when convection deepened rapidly over the storm. It moved west-southwestward, influenced by a mid-level ridge which extended from the Australian west coast. As the cyclone edged closer to the Cocos Islands, a cyclone warning was issued by the Tropical Cyclone Warning Centre in Perth for possible gale-force winds developing over the islands. Although Dianne passed about 30 km south of the islands, no gale-force winds were reported there. Dianne moved away from the Cocos Islands, and intensified further, developing a banding eye feature. Dianne continued moving to the west-southwest and crossed the boundary at 90°E into La Réunion's area of responsibility and was renamed Tropical Cyclone Jery by the Mauritius Meteorological Service; see 2001–02 South-West Indian Ocean cyclone season.

Tropical Cyclone Bonnie

An increase in deep convection occurred late on 9 April, with the Joint Typhoon Warning Center (JTWC) issuing a Tropical Cyclone Formation Alert for the developing system. Bonnie was moving west-southwestwards and made landfall on the Timorese coast on 10 April. The cyclone entered TCWC Perth's area of warning responsibility as it moved west of 125°E. Land interaction inhibited the storm from developing, but the cyclone later moved into the Savu Sea where good outflow enabled the storm to strengthen. Bonnie later moved over the south coast of Sumba on 11 April where the land mass weakened the storm again. Bonnie continued to move west-southwestwards but the storm began to slowly weaken as its deep convection decreased and interacted with the island of Java. TCWC Perth issued its last gale warning on Bonnie late on 14 April.

Bonnie caused heavy rainfall and gusty winds in Timor and Sumba. Flash flooding in Sumba killed 19 people. Bonnie also caused a moist northeast wind flow that triggered above average rainfall to northern Western Australia.

Tropical Cyclone Errol

Briefly attained tropical cyclone intensity 9–10 May north of Cocos Islands, and later passed to their east on 15 May as a weak tropical low.

Tropical Cyclone Upia

On 23 May a mass of convection north of Bougainville Island developed a well-defined mid-level circulation and broad low-level circulation. The center remained partially exposed for two more days until JTWC issued a Tropical Cyclone Formation Alert, placing the center about 100 nm south of the island. On 25 May, the storm was upgraded by the unofficial agency to Tropical Cyclone 25P. The waters around Papua New Guinea were part of the limited area of responsibility of TCWC Port Moresby. When the cyclone was located near Eastern Milne Bay Province they named the tropical cyclone Upia. Upia was the first system named by the TCWC at Port Moresby since Tropical Cyclone Adel in May 1993.

That night and into the early hours of the 27th, the storm caused havoc on Budibudi Island. All coconut trees – including those on adjacent islands – were flattened. Food crops on a nearby island used for agriculture were ruined by the surges. Several buildings were destroyed by Upia, although no fatalities were reported. The cyclone remained quasi-stationary for many hours until it began drifting south-southeastward. Port Moresby increased their intensity estimates for the system, reporting peak winds at  while JTWC estimated the system was considerably weaker. On 28 May JTWC issued their final warning on the system. Port Moresby issued their last warning that day as well. The system was downgraded to an ex-tropical cyclone by TCWC Brisbane when it drifted toward their region.

Other systems
A weak disturbance originated just west of TCWC Perth's area of responsibility about 625 nm west-northwest of Cocos Islands on 7 November. Over the next few days, it moved slowly east-southeastward towards Cocos. Perth issued gale warnings on the 10th in anticipation of tropical cyclone development. However, when the system failed to develop, the final warning was issued that day at 2200 UTC. Joint Typhoon Warning Center never issued warnings for the system, but did issue at Tropical Cyclone Formation Alert on 9 November. The Bureau of Meteorology continued mentioning the system in their Tropical Cyclone Outlooks. The system drifted back westward and was last mentioned on 13 November when it was about 500 nm from Cocos.

By 9 February a monsoon low had formed inland about 220 kilometers southwest of Darwin. This system drifted eastward over land, reaching the shoreline on the Gulf of Carpentaria on 13 February. TCWC Darwin anticipated tropical cyclone development for the system, and had issued Tropical Cyclone Advices for this system on the 12th and 13th. However, development failed to materialize. The monsoon low in conjunction with the active trough over Northern Territory produced floods in several of the area's river systems. Major flooding in the Wickham River tributary caused moderate flooding in the Victoria River. The Waterhouse River began rising on the 12th, forcing 500 people to evacuate. Katherine was threatened, but did not flood when the Katherine River rose to a peak of 17.03 metres on the 14th.

A tropical low formed in the southern Gulf of Carpentaria on 16 February east-northeast of Mornington Island. The low moved westwards and made landfall in the Northern Territory the next day. Tropical Cyclone Warning Centre in Darwin continued to track the monsoon low as it moved slowly westward across the southern portion of the territory. It is likely that this low was a continuation of the low that formed in the Gulf of Carpentaria, though TCWC Perth did not explicitly state this. The low remained inland as it continued to move westwards into the eastern Pilbara and finally dissipated on 28 February. Heavy rainfall caused the water level in the Fitzroy River to rise to near-record levels, with daily rainfall totals exceeding 100 mm. Many towns and communities, including Kununurra, were isolated by floodwaters, and several Aboriginal communities were evacuated. Significant stock losses occurred in the area. Bonney Downs in the Pilbara recorded a daily rainfall total of 229 mm on 27 February.

Season effects
This is a table of all of the storms that have formed in the 2001–02 Australian region cyclone season. It includes their duration, names, landfall(s)–denoted by bold location names – damages, and death totals. Damage and deaths include totals while the storm was extratropical, a wave, or a low, and all of the damage figures are in 2002 AUD and USD.

|-
| Alex ||  || bgcolor=#|Category 2 tropical cyclone || bgcolor=#| || bgcolor=#| || None || None || None ||
|-
| Low ||  || bgcolor=#|Tropical Low || bgcolor=#| || bgcolor=#| || None || None || None ||
|-
| 03S ||  || bgcolor=#|Tropical Low || bgcolor=#| || bgcolor=#| || Indonesia, Queensland || None || None ||
|-
| Bessi – Bako ||  || bgcolor=#|Category 2 tropical cyclone || bgcolor=#| || bgcolor=#| || None ||  ||  ||
|-
| Bernie ||  || bgcolor=#|Category 2 tropical cyclone || bgcolor=#| || bgcolor=#| || Northern Territory ||  ||  ||
|-
| Chris ||  || bgcolor=#|Category 5 severe tropical cyclone || bgcolor=#| || bgcolor=#| || Western Australia || $929,000 || None ||
|-
| Low ||  || bgcolor=#|Tropical low || bgcolor=#| || bgcolor=#| || Northern Territory || None || None ||
|-
| Low ||  || bgcolor=#|Tropical Low || bgcolor=#| || bgcolor=#|Not specified|| Western Australia, Northern Territory || None || None ||
|-
| Claudia ||  || bgcolor=#|Category 3 severe tropical cyclone || bgcolor=#| || bgcolor=#| || None || None || None ||
|-
| Des ||  || bgcolor=#|Category 2 tropical cyclone || bgcolor=#| || bgcolor=#| || Eastern Australia, New Caledonia ||  ||  ||
|-
| Dianne ||  || bgcolor=#|Category 3 severe tropical cyclone || bgcolor=#| || bgcolor=#| || None || None || None ||
|-
| Bonnie ||  || bgcolor=#|Category 2 tropical cyclone || bgcolor=#| || bgcolor=#| || Timor, Indonesia || None || 19 ||
|-
| Errol ||  || bgcolor=#|Category 1 tropical cyclone || bgcolor=#| || bgcolor=#| || None ||  ||  ||
|- 
| Upia ||  || bgcolor=#|Category 1 tropical cyclone || bgcolor=#| || bgcolor=#| || Budibudi Island, Papua New Guinea || None || None ||
|-

See also

List of Southern Hemisphere tropical cyclone seasons
List of off-season Australian region tropical cyclones
 Tropical cyclones in 2001, 2002
Atlantic hurricane seasons: 2001, 2002
Pacific hurricane seasons: 2001, 2002
Pacific typhoon seasons: 2001, 2002
North Indian Ocean cyclone seasons: 2001, 2002

References

External links
 Joint Typhoon Warning Center (JTWC) .
 Australian Bureau of Meteorology.
 World Meteorological Organization

 
Australian region cyclone seasons
2001 Aus
2002 Aus